Arenochroa is a genus of moths of the family Crambidae. It contains only one species, Arenochroa flavalis, which is found in Mexico and the United States, where it has been recorded from Arizona, Nevada and California.

References

Pyraustinae
Monotypic moth genera
Moths of North America
Crambidae genera
Taxa named by Eugene G. Munroe